The 1973 RAC British Saloon Car Championship was the 16th season of the championship. Frank Gardner became the second driver to win three BTCC titles, driving a Chevrolet Camaro.

Calendar & Winners
All races were held in the United Kingdom. Overall winners in bold.

Group 1 cars raced alongside Class A at round 7.  Holman 'Les' Blackburn won the class.

Championship results

References

British Touring Car Championship seasons
Saloon